STO may refer to:

Businesses and organizations

Government
 Science & Technology Organization, a NATO organization
 Service du travail obligatoire, French  men & women between certain ages deported to Germany during WWII to work as slave labour
 Société de transport de l'Outaouais, a public transit operator in Gatineau, Quebec, Canada
 Sojourner Truth Organization, a defunct American leftist group
 Sovet Truda i Oborony (Совет труда и обороны): Council of Labor and Defense, a Soviet central planning agency of the 1920s 
 United States Air Force Special Tactics Officer

Non-governmental organizations
 State Trading Organization, a publicly owned Maldivian company
 Statoil, a publicly traded Norwegian oil company

Science and technology
 Semi-automatic train operation
 Slater-type orbital, atomic orbitals
 STO-nG basis sets, of orbitals

Sports
 Space Tornado Ogawa, a professional wrestling throw
 SportsTime Ohio, a regional sports network in northeast Ohio, United States

Arts and entertainment
 Soldiers of the One, a group in the TV series Caprica
 Star Trek Online, a massively multiplayer online role-playing game
 STO, a posture emoticon used for representing a great admiration or great despair, see Emoticon#Orz
 Sto, pen name of illustrator Sergio Tofano

Transport
 STO, the National Rail station code for South Tottenham railway station, London, England
 The airports of Stockholm, Sweden, by IATA code

Other uses
 Safe Torque Off, an electronic signal used in industrial drives for safety function
 Security token offering, a type of public offering in which tokenized digital securities, are sold in cryptocurrency exchanges
 Stø, a village in Norway
 Stoney language (ISO 639-3 code)
 STO (professional wrestling), a maneuver in professional wrestling

See also
 STOS (disambiguation)